This page details the match results and statistics of the Cuba national football team from 2020 to present.

Cuba were due to play French Guiana in a 2021 CONCACAF Gold Cup qualification match on 3 July 2021, but a 3–0 win was awarded to French Guiana as the Cuba team were not granted visas to enter the United States.

Results
Cuba's score is shown first in each case.

References

External links
 World Football Elo Ratings: Cuba
 Cuba at WorldFootball.net

Cuba national football team results
2020s in Cuba